The Charleston Senators were an American minor league baseball team based in Charleston, West Virginia. They were the first professional baseball team to play in Charleston, beginning play in 1910. The team was inactive during a few periods, playing their last game in 1960.

History

The Senators competed in the Class A Central League from 1949 to 1951; the league folded in the fall of 1951, leaving Charleston without an active franchise in Minor League Baseball. Mid-season in 1952, Toledo Mud Hens owner Danny Menendez moved his team to Charleston, following a decline of ticket sales in Toledo. Competing as the Senators, the former Mud Hens played at the Triple-A level in the American Association through 1960.

See also
Charleston Charlies
West Virginia Power

References

Defunct minor league baseball teams
Defunct American Association (1902–1997) teams
Ohio State League teams
Middle Atlantic League teams
Mountain States League teams
Virginia Valley League teams
Central League teams
Washington Senators minor league affiliates
Detroit Tigers minor league affiliates
Chicago White Sox minor league affiliates
Cincinnati Reds minor league affiliates
Cleveland Guardians minor league affiliates
Boston Braves minor league affiliates
Baseball teams established in 1910
Sports clubs disestablished in 1960
1910 establishments in West Virginia
1960 disestablishments in West Virginia
Defunct baseball teams in West Virginia
Baseball teams disestablished in 1960